Jishan Gatehouse (literally "accumulate goodwill tower") is a historic gatehouse in Beitun District, Taichung, Taiwan. Initially constructed as the south entrance to a sanheyuan, the gatehouse is protected as a historical site in Taichung.

History 
The Lai family were one of the earliest Han Chinese settlers in Taichung. Originating from Pinghe County, Fujian in mainland China, the family settled in what is modern-day Beitun District. In 1898, a member of this family, Changrong Lai (賴長榮), moved from Touzhang to the north to the current location, building the sanheyuan known as "Huaidetang". A simple gate was constructed at the southern entrance. In 1924, the family decided to rebuild the southern entrance according to a feng shui specialist's advice. The new entrance is said to be able to boost the family's prosperity and keep them away from harm. The name of the building was taken to encourage future generations to act with kindness.

See also 
 History of Taiwan
 Han Taiwanese

References 

1924 establishments in Taiwan
Buildings and structures completed in 1924
Buildings and structures in Taichung